Holothrix is a genus of plants in family Orchidaceae. It contains the following species (but this list may be incomplete):

List of species 
Holothrix aphylla (Forssk.) Rchb.f., Otia Bot. Hamburg.: 119 (1881). 
Holothrix arachnoidea (A.Rich.) Rchb.f., Otia Bot. Hamburg.: 107 (1881). 
Holothrix aspera (Lindl.) Rchb.f., Otia Bot. Hamburg.: 119 (1881). 
Holothrix brevipetala Immelman & Schelpe, Bothalia 13: 455 (1981). 
Holothrix brongniartiana Rchb.f., Otia Bot. Hamburg.: 107 (1881). 
Holothrix buchananii Schltr., Oesterr. Bot. Z. 48: 447 (1898). 
Holothrix burchellii (Lindl.) Rchb.f., Otia Bot. Hamburg.: 119 (1881). 
Holothrix cernua (Burm.f.) Schelpe, Orchid Rev. 74: 394 (1966). 
Holothrix culveri Bolus, Trans. S. African Philos. Soc. 16: 147 (1905). 
Holothrix elgonensis Summerh., Bull. Misc. Inform. Kew 1932: 507 (1932). 
Holothrix exilis Lindl., Gen. Sp. Orchid. Pl.: 283 (1835). 
Holothrix filicornis Immelman & Schelpe, Bothalia 13: 455 (1981). 
Holothrix grandiflora (Sond.) Rchb.f., Otia Bot. Hamburg.: 119 (1881). 
Holothrix hydra P.J.Cribb, Kew Bull. 34: 321 (1979). 
Holothrix incurva Lindl., Companion Bot. Mag. 2: 207 (1836). 
Holothrix johnstonii Rolfe, Bull. Misc. Inform. Kew 1896: 47 (1896). 
Holothrix klimkoana Szlach. & Marg., Candollea 61: 468 (2006). 
Holothrix longicornu G.J.Lewis, J. S. Afr. Bot. 4: 53 (1938). 
Holothrix longiflora Rolfe, Bol. Soc. Brot. 7: 237 (1889). 
Holothrix macowaniana Rchb.f., Otia Bot. Hamburg.: 108 (1881). 
Holothrix majubensis C.Archer & R.H.Archer, S. African J. Bot. 62: 209 (1996). 
Holothrix micrantha Schltr., Bot. Jahrb. Syst. 20(50): 31 (1895). 
Holothrix montigena Ridl., J. Bot. 24: 295 (1886). 
Holothrix mundii Sond., Linnaea 19: 77 (1846). 
Holothrix nyasae Rolfe in D.Oliver & auct. suc. (eds.), Fl. Trop. Afr. 7: 193 (1898). 
Holothrix orthoceras (Harv.) Rchb.f., Otia Bot. Hamburg.: 119 (1881). 
Holothrix papillosa Summerh., Kew Bull. 14: 128 (1960). 
Holothrix parviflora (Lindl.) Rchb.f., Otia Bot. Hamburg.: 119 (1881). 
Holothrix pentadactyla (Summerh.) Summerh., Kew Bull. 14: 129 (1960). 
Holothrix pilosa (Burch. ex Lindl.) Rchb.f., Otia Bot. Hamburg.: 119 (1881). 
Holothrix pleistodactyla Kraenzl. in H.G.A.Engler (ed.), Pflanzenw. Ost-Afrikas, C: 151 (1895). 
Holothrix praecox Rchb.f., Otia Bot. Hamburg.: 108 (1881). 
Holothrix randii Rendle, J. Bot. 37: 208 (1899). 
Holothrix schimperi Rchb.f., Otia Bot. Hamburg.: 108 (1881). 
Holothrix schlechteriana Kraenzl. ex Schltr., Oesterr. Bot. Z. 49: 21 (1899). 
Holothrix scopularia Rchb.f., Otia Bot. Hamburg.: 119 (1881). 
Holothrix secunda (Thunb.) Rchb.f., Otia Bot. Hamburg.: 119 (1881). 
Holothrix socotrana Rolfe in H.O.Forbes, Nat. Hist. Sokotra: 507 (1903). 
Holothrix squamata (Hochst. ex A.Rich.) Rchb.f., Otia Bot. Hamburg.: 119 (1881). 
Holothrix thodei Rolfe in W.H.Harvey & auct. suc. (eds.), Fl. Cap. 5(3): 100 (1912). 
Holothrix tridactylites Summerh., Kew Bull. 16: 253 (1962). 
Holothrix tridentata (Hook.f.) Rchb.f., Otia Bot. Hamburg.: 119 (1881). 
Holothrix triloba (Rolfe) Kraenzl., Orchid. Gen. Sp. 1: 938 (1901). 
Holothrix unifolia Rchb.f., Otia Bot. Hamburg.: 119 (1881). 
Holothrix villosa Lindl., Companion Bot. Mag. 2: 207 (1836).

External links 
 
 

 
Orchideae genera
Taxonomy articles created by Polbot